Brian Jenkins (20 June 1943 – 24 December 2017) was a male English competitive swimmer.

Swimming career
Jenkins represented Great Britain in the Olympics and European championships. Jenkins won a silver medal in the 200-metre butterfly at the 1962 European Aquatics Championships.  He also competed in two events at the 1964 Summer Olympics in Tokyo, and finished eighth in the 4×100-metre medley relay.

At the ASA National British Championships he won the 220 yards butterfly title in 1961, 1962 and 1963. He also won the 200 metres medley title in 1971 and 1973 and the 440 yards medley title in 1963.

Personal life
Jenkins was accompanied at competition by his long-time girlfriend Gillian; they married in 1964. After that, he retired from senior swimming and worked as a plumber at Tamar Services. Later he competed in the masters category and won a national title in 1970.

He died on 24 December 2017.

References

1943 births
2017 deaths
Swimmers at the 1964 Summer Olympics
Olympic swimmers of Great Britain
Male butterfly swimmers
European Aquatics Championships medalists in swimming
Sportspeople from Swindon